"Ride" is a song from the Cary Brothers' album Who You Are.

Overview
Released on March 25, 2008, the song has gained great success in mainstream and was released in 2008 as a single with a remix and a new music video by Dutch DJ Tiësto. Brothers performed "Ride" alongside Tiësto at the Bonnaroo Music and Arts Festival to promote each other's tours. The remix charted 48 in the first week on the Billboard Hot Dance Club Play and it has reached 45 since then. The remix was included as the opening track in Tiësto's Club Life on Radio 538 as well as on the podcast and on Tiësto's In Search of Sunrise 7: Asia compilation.

Formats and track listings
CD, Maxi 
"Ride" - 3:41
"Ride" (Tiësto Extended Remix) - 7:05
"Ride" (Tiësto Radio Edit) - 3:41
"Ride" (Live Version) - 3:32
"Ride" (Video) - 3:32
"Ride" (Tiësto Radio Edit) [Video] - 3:40

CD, Maxi, Promo 
"Ride" (Tiësto Extended Remix) - 7:05
"Ride" (Tiësto Radio Edit) - 3:41
"Ride" (Video) - 3:32

CD, Maxi 
"Ride" (Tiësto Radio Edit) - 3:42
"Ride" - 3:39
"Ride" (Tiësto Extended Remix) - 7:00
"Ride" (Video) - 3:32

12" Vinyl 
"Ride" (Tiësto Extended Remix) - 7:05
"Ride" (Tiësto Radio Edit) - 3:41

Personnel
Mastered By: Michael Lazer
Mixed By: Chad Fisher, Greg Collins
Producer: Chad Fisher
Remixer and Additional Producer: Tiësto
Written By: Cary Brothers
Photo By: Michael Muller
Artwork and Design By: Hugo de Graaf (Songbird release)
Published By: Procrastination Music (BMI)
Produced At: Lookout Sound
Mastered At: Paramount Recording Studios
Music Video Produced By: Procrastination Music
Music Video Directed By: Tyler Shields

Charts

Release history

References

2007 songs
2008 singles
Song recordings produced by Chad Fischer
Tiësto songs